Lehlohonolo Seema (born 9 June 1980) is a Mosotho retired footballer who played as a defender and midfielder. He is currently the manager of Lamontville Golden Arrows in the South African Premier Division.

Career
Joining South African team Bloemfontein Celtic in the 1998/99 season, he moved to Orlando Pirates in 2006. Having previously captained Bloemfontein Celtic, he was a captain of Orlando Pirates and retired from the club on 1 July 2011.

International career
The star of the Lesotho national team, Seema was their only player who in 2003 played club football abroad. In 2001, he scored the winning goal from a penalty kick in the 87th minute of an African Cup of Nations qualifier versus Zimbabwe in Bulawayo to give Lesotho a famous victory.

References

1980 births
Lesotho footballers
Lesotho international footballers
Bloemfontein Celtic F.C. players
Association football defenders
Association football midfielders
Living people
Orlando Pirates F.C. players
Mpumalanga Black Aces F.C. players
Association football utility players
Expatriate soccer players in South Africa
Lesotho expatriate footballers
Lesotho expatriate sportspeople in South Africa
People from Mafeteng District
Bloemfontein Celtic F.C. managers
Lesotho football managers
Expatriate soccer managers in South Africa
Chippa United F.C. managers